The Hult Prize is an annual, year-long competition that crowd-sources ideas from university level students after challenging them to solve a pressing social issue around topics such as food security, water access, energy, and education. It was founded by a group of Hult International Business School MBAs and is funded by Bertil Hult, the latter of whom, along with his family – founders of EF Education First – donates US$1 million in seed capital to help the winning team launch a social enterprise.

Former U.S. president Bill Clinton selects the challenge topic and announces the winner each September; he mentioned it in a 2012 Time article about "the top 5 ideas that are changing the world for the better". The Hult Prize has been referred to as the "Nobel Prize for students" by Nobel laureate Muhammad Yunus.

History 
A lecture given by One Laptop Per Child chief operating officer Charles Kane sparked the idea for a business case competition focused on solving global problems via social entrepreneurship. In March 2010, MBA students Ahmad Ashkar, Tamara Sam, Carolin Bachmann, Jose Escobar and Nabil Chaachou launched the Hult Global Case Challenge, later renamed the Hult Prize. Students from over ninety business schools competed at three Hult campuses in Dubai, London and Boston simultaneously.

In 2011, the competition expanded into five regional rounds at Hult campuses around the globe (Shanghai, Dubai, London, Boston and San Francisco) with the winning team from each region continuing to the Global Finals in New York City. President Bill Clinton first announced the Hult Prize Winner (still called the Hult Global Case Challenge at the time) in 2011, and has done so in each subsequent year. In 2012, the competition expanded to include three tracks - energy, housing and education - and the Global Final was held at the New York Public Library. By 2013, the Prize attracted more than 10,000 MBA and undergraduate applicants.

Many major business schools run internal competitions to pre-qualify teams, which they then send into the competition. In 2018, more than 250,000 students from over 100 countries participated in the Hult Prize, competing for a total of $5m in prize money. As of 2017, the Hult Prize is at 1,000 universities around the world.

In 2021, the Hult Prize was suspended due to an investigation into sexual misconduct at a "summer camp-style event" it operates, the investigation was conducted by Kirkland & Ellis resulting in the replacement of the entire Hult Prize senior leadership team, including its Founder and CEO Ahmad Ashkar and staff member, Nelly Andrade.

Organization

Leadership 
Members of the current leadership team are; Lori Van Dam (CEO), Carla Osnaya (Director of Human Resources), Hamdi Ben Elmi (Senior Director of Programs), Camila Gonzalez Paciello (Director of Operations & Events)

Global Presence 

Hult Prize operates in different continents.

Boston 

Global Headquarters for the Hult Prize Foundation

North-America Regional Manager: Michael Boyle.

Mexico City

Regional Headquarters for Latin America & Caribbean.

Mumbai

Regional Headquarters for Central & South Asia.

Central & South Asia Regional Manager: Supriya Jangre

Taipei

Regional Headquarters for Asia Pacific.

Asia Pacific Regional Manager: Belen Marin Vysokolan

Lisbon

Regional Headquarters for Europe.

Europe Regional Manager: Ghada Ferchichi

Nairobi

Regional Headquarters for Sub Saharan Africa.

Africa Regional Manager: Cliff Nyakundi

Tunis

Regional Headquarters for Middle East and North Africa (MENA)

MENA Regional Manager: Yana Dabaghie

Programs 
Since its launch in 2010, The Hult Prize has launched several programs. The original competition is now the Hult Prize Flagship Competition, with other programs being the Hult Prize Regionals, Hult Prize on Campus, the Hult Prize Accelerator and the Hult Prize Summit. The flagship event continues to be the Annual Global Summit and Awards Gala hosted at the United Nations with its US$1,000,000 award for social entrepreneurship.

Competitions

2010: Early childhood education 

The inaugural Hult Prize was held as The Global Case Challenge and participants sought ways to support and scale the impact of One Laptop Per Child's mission in developing, producing and distributing affordable laptops, particularly for developing countries.

2011: Global water crisis 
In 2011, the Hult competition focused on the topic of clean water. Participants were challenged to provide and improve clean water and sanitation ways for the more than 2.5 billion people worldwide, that don't have access to it. The competition was held in partnership with Matt Damon and Water.org. The prize was awarded to a team from Cambridge University, led by Akanksha Hazari, with their proposal turning into the social enterprise m. Paani, working on digital ways to provide safe water, education, healthcare, energy, nutrition and mobility to rural Indian communities.

2012: Housing, education and energy 
In 2012, the Hult competition revolved around global energy poverty, seeking to support the many people worldwide, that still live without electricity. The challenge was focused on removing the use of kerosene lamps in Africa by 2018. The winner was a group from New York University Abu Dhabi, consisting of international students. The group was priced for their solution to supply solar lighting. To apply the student's ideas, NGO SolarAid was awarded with a part of the prize money.

2013: The Global Food Crisis 
Due to the fact that nearly one billion people worldwide are still suffering from hunger, the Hult Prize 2013 focused on the Global Food Crisis. The 2013 topic was personally chosen by Bill Clinton. The prize went to Aspire Food from McGill University for the idea of processing edible insects to produce a sustainable source of protein. This way providing slum communities with an easier and better access to essential nutrients.

2014: Solving Non-Communicable Disease in the Urban Slum 
The 2014 Hult Prize concentrated on Healthcare: Non-Communicable Disease in the Urban Slums. The students were challenged to build sustainable and scalable social enterprises to fight again non-communicable disease in slums. The prize was awarded to a group of five alumni from Indian School of Business (ISB). The winning team, Nano Health, suggested the education and employment of health workers, who would run screening camps, help to diagnose diseases and support citizens in lifestyle changes. The health workers were equipped with "Doc-in-a-Box" – a diagnostic tool for basic health indicators. Nano Health is supported by various industrial partners, including GVK Biosciences, who supported with the project with their tool HEART (Health Emphasized Analytical and Reporting Tool).

2015: Early Childhood Education 
In 2015, the prize challenged teams to find solutions for the early childhood education gap (0–6 years old kids). The winning team was IMPCT from the IMBA Program at National Chengchi University in Taiwan. The team developed PlayCare, a micro-equity platform, where everyone can invest in sustainable education businesses under a profit-sharing-model. The education businesses, like care centers in urban slums, supports also with educational efforts and increasing enrollment. The team also named Ann Louie Li their Founding Ambassador, who pioneered  the social media movement 'Creating an #IMPCT'.

2016: Crowded urban spaces  
The 2016 Hult Prize challenge for teams participating was to present the idea for a business that would double the income of 1 million people in the developing world by 2022. The prize was awarded to a team from Earlham College whose business idea, Magic Bus Ticketing, focused on improving the public transportation system in Kenya.

Judges at the 2016 competition were: Mohammed Ashour, CEO of Aspire Food Group, the late Bob Collymore, CEO of Safaricom, Brian Fetherstonhaugh, Chairman & CEO of OgilvyOne, Kathleen Rogers, President of Earth Day, Premal Shah, President and co-founder of Kiva and Muhammad Yunus, 2006 Nobel Peace Prize recipient.

2017: Refugees – Reawakening Human Potential 
In 2017, the Hult competition centered the motion of humanity, and the ensuing massive demographic shifts, which pressure social, political, and physical infrastructures. The Competition was won by Roshni Rides from Rutgers University.

2018: Transform – Harnessing the Power of Energy 
In 2018, the prize challenged student teams, from 121 countries to find and evolve energy innovations to enhance million of lives. The Hult Prize assumes, that it is necessary for the world to find more disruption that taps into energy innovations. The competition was won by team SunRice from University College London.

2019: Global Youth Unemployment 
In 2019, a team of Mexican entrepreneurs from the Tec de Monterrey won the Hult Prize with a project/start-up named Rutopía. The contest focused on global youth unemployment and attracted more than 250,000 participants from around the world.

2020: Climate Change 
In 2020, participants had to come up with a customer-centric business model that had a net positive environmental impact with every transaction made. Due to the pandemic, the accelerator was moved online and the $1M prize was split among 10 teams +1 jolly.

2021: Food for Good 
2021 Hult Prize challenged students to rethink our broken food systems by transforming food into a vehicle for change. Each of seven teams were selected as 2021 Hult Prize Winners.

2022: Getting the World Back to Work 
2022 Hult Prize challenged the students to rethink how the can get the world back to work. In this year EcoBana from St. Paul's University in Limuru, Kenya won the Hult prize.

Partnerships 
In 2010, the competition focused on education in partnership with One Laptop Per Child. The 2011 event partnered with water.org to focus on the provision of clean water.

References

Further reading 
 
 
 
 

Competitions
Social entrepreneurship
Competitions in the United States